Nockatunga Station, most commonly known as Nockatunga, is a pastoral lease that operates as a cattle station in South West Queensland, Australia.

Description
Situated in the channel country of outback Queensland the property includes frontage to the Wilson River.

The station is owned by the Harris family, trading under Cleveland Agriculture. Harris acquired the property in 2018 from Consolidated Pastoral Company, prior the Hughes family owned Nockatunga for 120 years. 
Noccundra Pub is located on the station, 20km from the station complex. The country is described as open bendee opening onto well grassed downs studded with water worn stones and lightly timbered with stunted gidyah. The open plains contain cotton bush and saltbush.

History
The traditional owners of the area are the Kullili people of the Garlali language group, who have inhabited the area for thousands of years. The name of the property is thought to be derived from the Aboriginal words from the Theirila language Nock meaning water and tunga meaning smell.

The station was established in 1866 when Alexander Munro took up the lease but it soon changed hands and was owned in 1869 by Patrick Drinan.

A herd of 6,500 cattle including 20 "well bred bulls" was included on the property that also claimed to have permanent waterholes "of sufficient depth to float the largest man'o'war", even during the severest drought.

Herbert Bristow Hughes acquired the station at auction in August 1872 for the sum of  £19,655.

Explorers Hume, O'Hea and Thompson left Nockatunga to journey further down Cooper Creek and into the interior to search for the remains of the Leichhardt expedition in December 1874 and quickly ran out of water in the intense heat. Thompson left the other two to find water and help, but when he returned both had died of dehydration.

The property was advertised for auction again in 1875. Nockatunga was now  or 1,188,000 acres in size and carrying a herd of about 13,000 cattle and 100 horses. The auction was delayed then was unsuccessful as Hughes still owned the property in 1876 and beyond.

Flooding occurred at the station in 1882 following heavy rains for 6 days with  falling at nearby properties. The Wilson river rose leaving Nockatunga surrounded by water and parts being swept away. Many outbuildings constructed of mudbrick were washed away. At the peak of the floods a horse wagon was caulked up and used as a raft to take supplies to higher ground.

Herbert Hughes died in 1892 in Adelaide, where he had long resided. The property was managed by a board of trustees until at least 1904; after that time the property was being run by John Maddock Hughes.

In 1901 drought struck much of south west Queensland with thousands of cattle dying of thirst at many properties. Nockatunga lost an estimated 27,897 cattle from a herd of approximately 30,000. Virtually no grasses remained on the ground as feed for stock. This was followed by a rabbit plague in 1905 when the pest had moved northwards and bred to plague proportions in the channel country reducing available feed for cattle.

Following a period of drought, the area experienced heavy rains in 1926 when  of rain fell over a few days.

The dingo population had increased and the property used 400 aborigines to cull the population. At Nockatunga over 713 dingos and their pups were slaughtered in the first six months of 1933.

The manager of the property in 1935 was Lucas Hughes, one of the Hughes family and on the board of trustees of H. B. Hughes. According to him decent rains had not been had at Nockatunga since 1926.

Hughes organised the construction of an airfield at Nockatunga in 1941 using 50 aborigines close to the homestead on a gibber plain. The working party took two days to clear the loose rocks and any brush along the  landing strip. The rocks were then placed around the aerodrome and the station was accessible to the Royal Flying Doctor Service.

The station found itself isolated in 1947 following record flooding. Both the station and the township of Noccundra were completely cut off and had no mail from late December 1946 to late February 1947.

An unfortunate stockman, George Dirkensen, fell into an open fire in January 1949 burning his hands, face and arms. He was over the river from the homestead but was unable to cross it and his cries were not noticed until the following morning. He was taken to Broken Hill later that day by the Royal Flying Doctor Service.

The record of the most cattle sent to Homebush market by one owner, H.B. Hughes Estate, was set in 1951 when 654 cattle from Nockatunga arrived. The herd had been overlanded to Bourke and then trucked to Flemington.

Noccundra
The townsite of Noccundra was established in 1882 and is located within the station boundaries, the only part that remains being the Noccundra Hotel. The licence for the hotel was first granted in 1886 and the hotel was built using locally quarried sandstone which was brought to the site by camel train. Besides being used for entertainment and accommodation the building serves as a medical and dental clinic for the Royal Flying Doctor Service as required. The building was heritage listed in 1977.

See also

List of ranches and stations
List of the largest stations in Australia

References

Stations (Australian agriculture)
Pastoral leases in Queensland
South West Queensland
1866 establishments in Australia